Pete Perreault  (March 1, 1939 – December 8, 2001) was an American football guard who played nine seasons of professional football. He played for the American Football League's New York Jets from 1963 through 1967, for the AFL's Cincinnati Bengals in 1968, then returned to the Jets in 1969. He also played for the National Football League's Jets in 1970 and the Minnesota Vikings in 1971.

Peter W. Perrault was born in Shrewsbury, Massachusetts. He attended Shrewsbury High School, Cheshire Academy and Boston University. He was inducted into the Shrewsbury High School Athletic Hall of Fame in 1991, and is remembered in the Peter Perreault Student/Athlete Of The Year Scholarship Award, presented each year since 2003.

See also
Other American Football League players

References

1939 births
2001 deaths
People from Shrewsbury, Massachusetts
Sportspeople from Worcester County, Massachusetts
Players of American football from Massachusetts
American football offensive guards
American football linebackers
Boston University Terriers football players
Boston University alumni
Cincinnati Bengals players
New York Jets players
Minnesota Vikings players
American Football League players
Cheshire Academy alumni